Eugen Wiesberger can refer to:

 Eugen Wiesberger Sr. (born 1900), Austrian Olympic wrestler
 Eugen Wiesberger Jr. (1933-1996), Austrian Olympic wrestler, son of the above